Jermaine Seoposenwe (born 12 October 1993) is a South African soccer player who plays as a forward for Mexican Liga MX Femenil club FC Juárez and the South Africa women's national team.

Club career

Gintra Universitetas 
On 16 April 2019, it was announced that Seoposenwe had signed her first professional contract with Gintra Universitetas in Lithuania, joining them to play in the 2019-20 UEFA Women's Champions League season. She joined alongside South Africa teammate Nothando Vilakazi. 

Seoposenwe made two Champions League appearances for Gintra, besides helping the side win the 2019 A Lyga Women and Amber Cup titles.

Real Betis 
Seoposenwe signed for Spanish side Real Betis Balompie on 8 February 2020, making her debut in a 2–1 victory over RC Espanyol the following weekend.

The season would be called to an end early due to the COVID-19 global pandemic with Seoposenwe having made three appearances across all competitions.

SC Braga 
On 6 July 2020, Seoposenwe was announced as a new player of SC Braga. She made an immediate impact at the club in her first campaign, scoring twice on 13 January 2021 against rivals SL Benfica in the final of the Taca de Portugal in a 3–1 victory.

In her second season at the club Seoposenwe scored 8 goals and provided 7 assists in 19 league appearances as the club finished third in the Campeonato Nacional. On 23 March 2022, SC Braga won the Taca da Liga on penalties against SL Benfica with Seoposenwe playing the entire 120 minutes.

International career
On 18 October 2015, Seoposenwe scored the winning goal against Equatorial Guinea which secured South Africa's qualification to the 2016 Summer Olympics in Rio de Janeiro. At the tournament she started all three of South Africa's matches as they exited at the Group Stage.

Seoposenwe was a key player for South Africa at the 2018 CAF Africa Women Cup of Nations with Banyana Banyana reaching the final only to lose to Nigeria in a penalty shootout. The result qualified South Africa for the 2019 FIFA Women's World Cup for their first appearance at the competition, with Seoposenwe part of the 23 player squad for the tournament in France. At the competition, she featured in matches with China and Spain.

On the 4th July 2022, Seoposenwe scored Banyana Banyana's first goal in their 2–1 win against Nigeria at the 2022 Africa Women Cup of Nations.

Honours

SC Braga 

 Taca de Portugal: 2019-20
 Taca da Liga: 2021-22

Gintra Universitetas 

 A Lyga: 2019

South Africa 

 Womens Africa Cup of Nations: 2018 (runner-up)
Womens Africa Cup Of Nations: 2022  (Winner)

International goals
Scores and results list South Africa's goal tally first

References

External links
 Samford bio

1993 births
Living people
Soccer players from Cape Town
South African women's soccer players
Women's association football forwards
Samford Bulldogs women's soccer players
Gintra Universitetas players
S.C. Braga (women's football) players
FC Juárez footballers
Campeonato Nacional de Futebol Feminino players
South Africa women's international soccer players
Footballers at the 2016 Summer Olympics
Olympic soccer players of South Africa
2019 FIFA Women's World Cup players
South African expatriate soccer players
South African expatriate sportspeople in Lithuania
Expatriate women's footballers in Lithuania
South African expatriate sportspeople in Spain
Expatriate women's footballers in Spain
South African expatriate sportspeople in Portugal
Expatriate women's footballers in Portugal
South African expatriates in Mexico
Expatriate women's footballers in Mexico